Teresa M. Bejan is an American political theorist and author. She is a professor of political theory in the department of politics and international relations at the University of Oxford and a fellow of Oriel College.

She received her PhD with distinction from Yale University in 2013 and won the American Political Science Association's 2015 Leo Strauss Award for the best doctoral dissertation in political philosophy. She holds degrees from the University of Chicago and University of Cambridge.

Her 2017 book Mere Civility: Disagreement and the Limits of Toleration, published by Harvard University Press, examines contemporary handling of civility, disagreement and freedom of speech in the light of arguments by the 17th-century thinkers Thomas Hobbes, John Locke and Roger Williams. She argues in Mere Civility that Roger Williams' approach of open disagreement with, and even expression of contempt for, opponents is a stronger basis for a liberal and inclusive society than the approaches of Hobbes or Locke, on the grounds that both Hobbes and Locke see a role for suppression and exclusion in building a tolerant society.

Bejan gave the Balzan-Skinner lecture at the University of Cambridge on 22 April 2016, entitled Acknowledging Equality, in which she questioned modern conceptions of equality through examining 'ideas of equality as a political principle, a religious commitment, and a social practice in seventeenth-century England.'

In the aftermath of Donald Trump's election as president, Bejan argued against the use of calls for civility by both Trump's supporters and opponents as a way to silence those who disagree with them.

References

External links 
 
Faculty profile at the University of Oxford

Year of birth missing (living people)
Living people
American political philosophers
Academics of the University of Oxford
Yale Graduate School of Arts and Sciences alumni